Niilo Ensio Turkkila (22 March 1921 – 25 August 2012) was a Finnish wrestler. Competing in the 57 kg division he won national titles in Greco-Roman wrestling in 1949–50 and in freestyle wrestling in 1950–51, and placed second in freestyle at the 1951 World Championships. After retiring from competitions he worked as a wrestling referee and sports functionary. He was married and had three children, born in 1946, 1948 and 1954.

References

1921 births
2012 deaths
Finnish male sport wrestlers
World Wrestling Championships medalists
20th-century Finnish people
21st-century Finnish people